Linker for activation of T-cells family member 2 is a protein that in humans is encoded by the LAT2 gene.

This gene is one of the contiguous genes at 7q11.23 commonly deleted in Williams syndrome, a multisystem developmental disorder. This gene consists of at least 14 exons, and its alternative splicing generates 3 transcript variants, all encoding the same protein.

References

Further reading